Hollie Davidson is a professional rugby union referee who is contracted with the Scottish Rugby Union.

Playing career 

Davidson began playing competitive rugby when she was 14.  She played at scrum-half for Murrayfield Wanderers, one of the most successful women's rugby union teams in Scotland. During her time there she was known as the speed bump. However a shoulder injury put paid to her playing career.

At Edinburgh University she played for the women's rugby side winning the BUCS final.

Davidson played for Scotland U20's for 2 seasons from 2010-12 One week before she was due to receive a senior cap she dislocated her shoulder.

Referee career

Professional career

In 2015 Davidson joined the SRU's refereeing course, when a new course was held on Saturdays. Prior to this time the refereeing courses were held on Sunday, the same day as women's professional rugby matches, thus making it impossible for women to train as referees. Davidson became Scottish Rugby Union's first full time professional women's referee in 2017.
In 2018, Davidson was Assistant Referee for the Glasgow Warriors v Zebre match in the Pro14.

In 2019 Davidson became the first woman to referee in the Melrose Sevens.
On 16 November 19 she refereed the Stirling County v Southern Knights match in the Super 6. In January 2021 Davidson was appointed to officiate a men's professional match for the first time. That match, and a subsequent match to which she was appointed, were cancelled, and she was then appointed in March 2021 to a further Pro 14 Fixture. She refereed her first Pro14 fixture on 19 March 2021; a Munster v Benetton match, winning plaudits from the Munster Head Coach Johann van Graan: "I thought the referee was very good. She was very calm, she communicated to the players exceptionally well before the game. I felt she handled the game really well and I think a real good step forward for her and was very pleased with her performance."

Davidson refereed the 1872 Cup match on 18 March 2022 between Glasgow Warriors and Edinburgh Rugby in the United Rugby Championship.

International career 

From 2017 Davidson has refereed in the World Rugby Women's Sevens.
In 2018 she refereed in the Rugby Europe, the Commonwealth Games and the Rugby World Cup Sevens

Davidson has refereed in the 2019 Women's Six Nations Championship in the Wales v Ireland match on 17 March 2019.

In 2021 Davidson was chosen as one of the referees for the rugby 7's tournament at the delayed 2020 Summer Olympics

In 2022 she was appointed to an all-women team of match officials for a men's test match in Lisbon between a Tier 1 side, and the host .
Davidson handed 3 yellow cards (2 to Italy, one to Portugal) and the game was won 38-31 by Italy.

In November 2022 Davidson was appointed to referee the final of the 2021 Rugby World Cup between hosts New Zealand and England.

Outside of rugby
Davidson has a degree in Economic History from Edinburgh University.
Before being a professional referee, Davidson was a Fund Accounting Specialist at J. P. Morgan.

References

External links
San Francisco World Cup Sevens
STV News report on Hollie Davidson
BBC Alba report on Hollie Davidson's refereeing style

Living people
Scottish rugby union referees
Rugby union officials
Female rugby union referees
Year of birth missing (living people)
Super 6 referees
United Rugby Championship referees
1872 Cup referees